Billot is a French surname. It may refer to:

Jean-Baptiste Billot (1828–1907), French general and politician
Ken Billot (born ?), New Zealand footballer
Louis Billot (1846–1931), French theologian, elevated to cardinal (later resigned)
Nicolas-Joseph Billot de La Ferrière (1749–1816), French actor (see by his stage name: Florence (actor))
Paul Constant Billot (1796–1863), French botanist
Victor Billot, New Zealand writer, musician, trade unionist, and politician

See also
Fayl-Billot, a district of France